Guilherme Pereira da Costa (born 1 October 1998) is a Brazilian swimmer. He is the 400m freestyle bronze medalist at the 2022 World Championships. In the 1500 metre freestyle, he is the gold medalist at the 2019 Pan American Games. He is also currently the South American record holder in the 400, 800, and 1500 metre freestyle.

International career

2017–2021
He competed in the men's 1500 metre freestyle event at the 2017 World Aquatics Championships, finishing in 19th place.

On 6 December 2017, participating in the Brazil Open (long course) in Rio de Janeiro, he broke the South American record in the 1500-metre freestyle with a time of 14:59.01. It was the fourth time in 2017 that he broke the South American record of this race.

At the 2018 South American Games in Cochabamba, he won the gold medal in the 400m and the silver medal in the 1500m freestyle.

On 30 June 2018, participating in the Sette Colli Trophy (long course) in Rome, he broke the South American record in the 800-metre freestyle with a time of 7:50.92.

At the 2018 Pan Pacific Swimming Championships in Tokyo, Japan, he finished 4th in the Men's 4 × 200 metre freestyle relay, 4th in the Men's 800 metre freestyle and 4th in the Men's 1500 metre freestyle.

At the 2019 World Aquatics Championships in Gwangju, South Korea, he finished 21st in the Men's 800 metre freestyle, and 25th in the Men's 1500 metre freestyle.

At the 2019 Pan American Games held in Lima, Peru, Costa won his biggest title, the gold medal in the Men's 1500 metre freestyle, with a time of 15:09.93. Brazil has not won this event at the Pan American Games since Tetsuo Okamoto won it in the first edition of the Games, in 1951.

In December 2019, participating in the U.S. Open (long course) in Atlanta, he broke the South American record in the 400-metre freestyle, with a time of 3:46.57, in the 800-metre freestyle, with a time of 7:47.37  and in the 1500-metre freestyle, with a time of 14:55.49.

On 19 April 2021, participating in the Brazilian Olympic Selection Trials, he lowered his South American record in the 400m freestyle with a time of 3:45.85.

2020 Summer Olympics–present
At the 2020 Summer Olympics in Tokyo, Costa almost broke the South American record in the Men's 400 metre freestyle heats, with a time of 3:45.99. He finished in 11th place, 0.32s from getting a place in the final. In the 800 metre freestyle, he broke the South American record at heats with a time of 7:46.08, ranking 5th for the final. Costa finished 8th in the 800m freestyle final, and later, 13th in the heat of the 1500m freestyle.

He did not attend the 2021 FINA World Swimming Championships (25 m), in Abu Dhabi, United Arab Emirates, because he felt some symptoms such as fever and malaise, which made him withdraw from the competition.

At the 2022 World Aquatics Championships, in Budapest, Hungary, he became the first Brazilian and South American in history to win a medal in the 400-meter freestyle event, obtaining bronze with a time of 3:43.31, a new South American record. It was the first medal by a South American in the men's 400 free from any major international meet since Argentinian Alberto Zorrilla at the 1928 Olympics. No South American had ever even qualified for the 400m freestyle final at the World Championships. In the 800m freestyle, Costa broke the South American record with a time of 7:45.48, finishing in 5th place, the best position ever obtained by a South American in the event (no South American swimmer had even reached the final of this event in World Championships). In the 1500m freestyle, Costa broke the South American record at heats, with a time of 14:53.03, qualifying 4th for the final. In the final, Costa destroyed the South American record, lowering it by more than 4 seconds, with a time of 14:48.53, finishing in 6th place and equaling the best mark in the history of Brazil in the race (6th place of Luiz Lima in 1998). After the pool events, he swam in the open waters in the Mixed 6km Relay Team, where Brazil finished in 5th place.

In September 2022, at the José Finkel Trophy in Recife, he broke the short course South American record in the 800-metre freestyle with a time of 7:41.23. and in the 1500-metre freestyle, with a time of 14:39.42.

He did not attend the 2022 FINA World Swimming Championships (25 m), in Melbourne, Australia, despite having an index for the competition.

References

External links
 

1998 births
Living people
Place of birth missing (living people)
South American Games gold medalists for Brazil
South American Games medalists in swimming
Competitors at the 2018 South American Games
Competitors at the 2022 South American Games
Swimmers at the 2019 Pan American Games
Pan American Games gold medalists for Brazil
Pan American Games medalists in swimming
Medalists at the 2019 Pan American Games
Brazilian male freestyle swimmers
Swimmers at the 2020 Summer Olympics
Olympic swimmers of Brazil
Swimmers from Rio de Janeiro (city)
World Aquatics Championships medalists in swimming
21st-century Brazilian people